is a retired Japanese judoka.

Hamada is from Tsushima, Ehime. He belonged to Ehime Prefectural Police after graduation from Matsuyama University in 1978.

Hamada was good at Seoi nage, Kouchi gari and Newaza. He participated Asian Championships held in Jakarta, Indonesia in 1981 and won a gold medal. He also won a gold medal at Pacific Rim Championships in 1983.

In 1985, Hamada entered Nippon Sport Science University to be a teacher. After graduation in 1987, he coached judo at high-school in Ehime Prefecture and his old school, Matsuyama University.

As of 2010, Hamada has coachede judo at National Institute of Fitness and Sports in Kanoya since 2002.

Achievements
1976 - Kodokan Cup (-60 kg) 3rd
1977 - All-Japan Selected Championships (-60 kg) 2nd
1978 - Jigoro Kano Cup (-60 kg) 3rd
 - All-Japan Selected Championships (-60 kg) 2nd
 - Kodokan Cup (-60 kg) 3rd
1979 - Kodokan Cup (-60 kg) 1st
 - All-Japan Selected Championships (-60 kg) 3rd
1981 - Asian Championships (-60 kg) 1st
 - All-Japan Selected Championships (-60 kg) 1st
1982 - Jigoro Kano Cup (-60 kg) 3rd
 - All-Japan Selected Championships (-60 kg) 3rd
 - Kodokan Cup (-60 kg) 3rd
1983 - Pacific Rim Championships (-60 kg) 1st
 - Kodokan Cup (-60 kg) 1st
1984 - All-Japan Selected Championships (-60 kg) 3rd
1985 - All-Japan Selected Championships (-60 kg) 2nd
 - Kodokan Cup (-60 kg) 3rd

References 

Japanese male judoka
Sportspeople from Ehime Prefecture
1955 births
Living people